Idoceras is a genus of perisphictacean ammonite, belonging to the Perisphinctidae subfamily Idoceratinae.  The genus is known from the Upper Jurassic, with a widespread distribution.  Shells of Idoceras are evolute, with a wide umbilicus; ribbing strong, bifurcate high on flanks. Suture simpler than in the similar Ataxioceras.

References

Jurassic ammonites
Ammonitida genera
Perisphinctidae
Ammonites of Europe